Henryk Zygalski (15 July 1908 – 30 August 1978) was a Polish mathematician and cryptologist who worked at breaking German Enigma ciphers before and during World War II.

Life
Zygalski was born on 15 July 1908 in Posen, German Empire (now Poznań, Poland). He was, from September 1932, a civilian cryptologist with the Polish General Staff's Biuro Szyfrów (Cipher Bureau), housed in the Saxon Palace in Warsaw.  He worked there with fellow Poznań University alumni and Cipher Bureau cryptology-course graduates Marian Rejewski and Jerzy Różycki. Together they developed methods and equipment for breaking Enigma messages.

In late 1938, in response to growing complexities in German encryption procedures, Zygalski designed the "perforated sheets," also known as "Zygalski sheets," a manual device for finding Enigma settings. This scheme, like the earlier "card catalog," was independent of the number of connections being used in the Enigma's plugboard, or commutator.

After the war, he remained in exile in the United Kingdom and worked, until his retirement, as a lecturer in mathematical statistics at the University of Surrey. During this period he was prevented by the Official Secrets Act from speaking of his achievements in cryptology.

He died on 30 August 1978 in Liss, England, was cremated and his ashes taken to London.

Recognition
Shortly before his death, Zygalski was honored by the Polish University in Exile with an honorary doctorate for his role in breaking Enigma.

In 2000 he was posthumously awarded by President Aleksander Kwaśniewski the Grand Cross of the Order of Polonia Restituta for his "outstanding contributions to the Republic of Poland".

In 2009 the Polish Post issued a commemorative stamp featuring Henryk Zygalski alongside fellow cryptologists Marian Rejewski and Jerzy Różycki.

In 2021 the Enigma Cipher Centre, an educational and scientific institution dedicated to the Polish mathematicians who broke the Enigma cipher, including Henryk Zygalski, opened in Poznań.

See also
 Cryptanalysis of the Enigma
 List of cryptographers
 List of Polish mathematicians

References

 Władysław Kozaczuk, Enigma:  How the German Machine Cipher Was Broken, and How It Was Read by the Allies in World War II, edited and translated by Christopher Kasparek, Frederick, MD, University Publications of America, 1984, .

Scientists from Poznań
Polish Army officers
20th-century Polish mathematicians
Pre-computer cryptographers
Polish cryptographers
Cipher Bureau (Poland)
Polish emigrants to the United Kingdom
20th-century Polish inventors
Academics of the University of Surrey
1908 births
1978 deaths
Adam Mickiewicz University in Poznań alumni